The Superintendent of Public Instruction was an elected office in the state government of Indiana. The official was an elected member of the executive branch of government and work with the state Board of Education as head of the Indiana Department of Education to oversee certain areas of public schools in Indiana. The position was created in 1851 with the adoption of the Constitution of Indiana, and filled in the first general election following its creation. The position of the Superintendent of Public Instruction was abolished in 2021, being replaced by the Secretary of Education, who is appointed by the Governor.

The annual salary of the Superintendent of Public Instruction of Indiana was $94,538.

List of Superintendents

Notes

See also

Government of Indiana

Sources

 
1851 establishments in Indiana

https://ballotpedia.org/Indiana_Superintendent_of_Public_Instruction